William Waqo was an Anglican bishop in Kenya. He was Assistant Bishop of Kirinyaga and Provincial Secretary to  Archbishop Benjamin Nzimbi.

He died in a plane crash on 10 April 2006.

References

21st-century Anglican bishops of the Anglican Church of Kenya
Anglican bishops of Kirinyaga
Year of birth missing
2006 deaths